Byland with Wass is a  civil parish in the Ryedale district of North Yorkshire, England.  According to the 2001 census it had a population of 120, increasing to an estimated 160 in 2015. (At the 2011 Census the parish was included with the parish of Oldstead and not counted separately.) It covers Byland Abbey and Wass, in the North York Moors, and shares a parish council with Oldstead.

References

Civil parishes in North Yorkshire